Josef-Horst Lederer (born 18 September 1944) is an Austrian musicologist.

Life 
Born in Celje, Styria, today Slovenia, Lederer studied musicology with Othmar Wessely at the University of Music and Performing Arts Graz. He also studied piano and music theory at the University of Music and Performing Arts Graz. He gained his Doctorate in 1971 with a thesis on Lorenzo Penna. (1613–1693). Josef-Horst Lederer: Lorenzo Penna und seine Kontrapunkttheorie.

Initially he worked as an assistant at the Musicological Institute of the University of Mainz in 1971/1972 with Hellmut Federhofer.In 1973 he moved back to Graz were he habilitated in 1985 in the field of historical musicology. In 1987 he was awarded the rank of associate professor.

Lederer is involved in the New Mozart Edition, the Gluck and the Johann Joseph Fux complete editions, but also on various committees.

His research focuses on opera and symphonic music.

Further reading 
 Josef-Horst Lederer: Lederer, Josef-Hors. In Ludwig Finscher (ed.): Die Musik in Geschichte und Gegenwart. Second edition, personal section, volume 10 (Kemp – Lert). Bärenreiter/Metzler, Kassel among others. 2003,  (subscription required for full access)
 Kritischer Bericht: by Horst-Josef Lederer.

References

External links 
 

University of Graz alumni
20th-century Austrian musicologists
21st-century musicologists
1944 births
Living people
Writers from Celje